"Nobody Hears" is a song recorded by rock band Suicidal Tendencies. It was released as the first single from the band's 1992 album The Art of Rebellion, and became their biggest U.S. hit at the time, peaking at number 28 on the Billboard Mainstream Rock chart.

Music video
The video was for "Nobody Hears" was aired in December 1992, and directed by Samuel Bayer, who had recently directed the video for Nirvana's "Smells Like Teen Spirit". The video is almost entirely in black and white and features the band performing the song.

References

1992 singles
Suicidal Tendencies songs
Songs written by Mike Muir
1992 songs
Epic Records singles
Songs written by Rocky George
Song recordings produced by Peter Collins (record producer)